Mustafa Jassem Al-Shamali (born 1943) is a Kuwaiti politician who has had held different cabinet posts. He served as Minister of Finance between 2007 and May 2012. He also served as oil minister from 4 August 2013 to January 2014.

Early life and education
Shamali was born in 1943. He received a bachelor's degree in business and management from Ain Shams University, Egypt, in 1968.

Career
Shamali started his career at the ministry of finance following the graduation. He held different positions at the ministry, including director of the economic cooperation department (1975-1982), director of the ministry's general diwan (1985-1986), the ministry's undersecretary for economic affairs (1986-2006), and director of the ministry's undersecretary (2006-2007).

On 13 December 2011, Shamali was appointed minister of health, but was replaced by Ali Saad Al Obeidi on 14 February 2012. Shamali was appointed as finance minister in a cabinet reshuffle in February 2012.

On 27 May 2013, Shamali was also appointed acting oil minister to succeed Hani Hussein who resigned from office. On 4 August he was appointed oil minister. Salem Abdulaziz Al Sabah replaced Shamali as finance minister. Shamali was also made deputy prime minister in the same reshuffle. In addition, he is chairman of the board of the Kuwait Investment Authority (KIA).

In January 2014, Ali Al Omair was appointed oil minister and replaced him in the post.

The "Settling Score and Revenge Grilling" Incident
In March 2012, Musallam Al-Barrak, Chairman of Kuwait’s Public Funds’ Protection Committee  announced that a motion would be filed against officials at the KIA by the Popular Action Bloc, in relation to payments made by the KIA to Kuwaiti companies. In a public statement, Al-Barrak stated that Al-Shamali would be “stopped and held accountable for failing to protect public funds” against corruption. Al-Shamali resigned at the podium during the grilling after answering and addressing all the points raised by Al-Barrak, claiming the whole affair was a political "witch-hunt", and revenge by Al- Barrak and members of the opposition in the National Assembly. The questioning session “deviated from serving the public interest and is for revenge and settling scores with the finance minister and some of his aides” stated Al-Shamali, and resignation mark fresh tensions with the government which was 3 months old, which lead to the dissolution of the National Assembly soon after. Al-Shamali return to the new government after the dissolution of the National Assembly, with the confident of the Prime Minister, and His Highness the Emir of Kuwait.

References

1943 births
Living people
Ain Shams University alumni
Finance ministers of Kuwait
Oil ministers of Kuwait